Joachim Bäse (2 September 1939 – 22 December 2020) was a German football player. He was born in Braunschweig. He spent ten seasons in the Bundesliga with Eintracht Braunschweig, starting with the league's foundation in 1963. In total, Bäse played 347 matches in all official competitions for Braunschweig, scoring 33 goals.

He also represented Germany once, in a friendly against Wales.

Bäse died on 22 December 2020, aged 81.

Honours
 Bundesliga champion: 1966–67 (Bäse was team captain)

References

External links
 

1939 births
2020 deaths
German footballers
Sportspeople from Braunschweig
Germany international footballers
Eintracht Braunschweig players
Bundesliga players
Association football midfielders
Footballers from Lower Saxony